The John H. Traband House is a historic home located at Upper Marlboro in Prince George's County, Maryland, United States. It was built between 1895 and 1897, and is a -story, asymmetrically shaped Queen Anne influenced frame structure of modest size and detailing. Also located on the property are a frame two-story gable-roofed carriage house. The house was constructed as the residence of a prominent citizen, John H. Traband (1857–1938), who was a successful businessman and landholder in Upper Marlboro.
 
The John H. Traband House was listed on the National Register of Historic Places in 1984.  It is located in the Upper Marlboro Residential Historic District.

References

External links
, including photo in 1973, at Maryland Historical Trust website

Houses completed in 1897
Houses in Prince George's County, Maryland
Queen Anne architecture in Maryland
Houses on the National Register of Historic Places in Maryland
National Register of Historic Places in Prince George's County, Maryland
Individually listed contributing properties to historic districts on the National Register in Maryland